Ockert Johannes Erasmus (born 20 January 1988) is a South African professional cricketer who currently plays for Boland. He is a right-handed batsman and bowls right-arm off break.

Erasmus made his first-class debut for Boland in December 2009, having played his first List A match some ten months earlier. He has also played club cricket in England, for both Northern League side Netherfield and Lancashire League team East Lancashire, where he is currently the club professional.

References

1988 births
Living people
People from Ladysmith, KwaZulu-Natal
Afrikaner people
South African people of German descent
South African cricketers
Boland cricketers